Susana Rodríguez Gacio (born 4 March 1988) is a Spanish doctor, paratriathlete and sprinter. She is a four-time world champion in paratriathlon and a Paralympic gold medalist in paratriathlon.

Background
Rodríguez was born with albinism and a severe visual impairment that limits her vision to less than 5% in one eye and 8% in the other, which is considered legal blindness.

Since childhood, she combines her dedication to sports with a passion for medicine. Since 1998, Rodríguez has practiced athletics with a teacher from the National Organization of the Spanish Blind (ONCE) at the Pontevedra Technification Center. She participated in athletics competitions until 2008, the year when she did not get a place in the Paralympic World Cup, she decided to change her sporting activity to triathlon.

Career
In 2009, Rodríguez studied physiotherapy in Pontevedra in the Pontevedra Campus and in 2015 she graduated from the University of Santiago de Compostela with a degree in medicine, the year in which she began as a resident intern physician. She began her residency at the Hospital Clínico de Santiago de Compostela in 2016, working as a resident intern of physical medicine and rehabilitation.

In 2016, Rodríguez competed in the 2016 Paralympic Games in Rio de Janeiro with her guide Mabel Gallardo, finishing fifth in the individual triathlon event. She qualified to participate in the 2020 Summer Paralympics, being the first Spaniard to compete in two sports in the Paralympic Games: triathlon and athletics. She became the Paralympic triathlon champion in the PTVI class with her guide Sara Loehr. In addition, she became a candidate for the Athletes' Council of the International Paralympic Committee.

Rodríguez won a gold medal at Tokyo 2020 in the PTVI category. In addition, she obtained seven medals in the Adapted Triathlon World Championship between 2012 and 2019, and six medals in the Adapted Triathlon World Championship between 2013 and 2019.

Awards and honors
In 2014, Rodríguez was recognized with the Premio Gallega del Año for February awarded by El Correo Gallego, Terras de Santiago, Correo TV and Radio Obradoiro. In 2021, she appeared on the cover of Time magazine for her dedication in the fight against COVID-19. That same year, the National Organization of the Spanish Blind (ONCE) dedicated a coupon to her for her participation in the 2020 Paralympic Games. In addition, she was awarded the Special Prize for MAS Talent on Board 2021, one of the three special awards of the VIII Women to Follow Awards, delivered in collaboration with Iberia.

On 15 November 2021, the plenary session of the Vigo City Council awarded Rodríguez the city's gold medal.

References

External links 

1988 births
Living people
Sportspeople from Vigo
Spanish female triathletes
Spanish female sprinters
Spanish women physicians
Paralympic athletes of Spain
Paratriathletes of Spain
Paratriathletes at the 2020 Summer Paralympics
Athletes (track and field) at the 2020 Summer Paralympics
Medalists at the 2020 Summer Paralympics
Paralympic gold medalists for Spain
Paralympic athletes with a vision impairment
Spanish blind people
University of Santiago de Compostela alumni
Scientists with disabilities